The W type carriages were wooden passenger carriages used on the railways of Victoria, Australia. There were two variants, short- and long-body vehicles, and this article deals with the former. Details on the latter can be found here.

History

In the early 20th century, the Victorian Railways decided to convert the metropolitan part of the network to electric traction. As part of that project, a large number of "Swing Door" ("dog box") cars were converted to electric traction, which left a gaping hole in the carriage fleet. As a result, the 'W' series of passenger cars was built. Four variations were constructed from 1911 onwards: AW, ABW, BW and CW.

The origin of the 'W' designation is unclear. In most other cases the class letter was derived from a basic feature of the car type, or its use. In the 1900s, new express passenger cars, designated 'E', were being built to replace ageing equipment. The W-class cars were of a similar design but modified for general stopping trains. Peter J. Vincent believes the 'W' may represent 'Wayside' or non-express passenger type.

Design and Construction
The fifteen 1925 cars were the same dimensions but with curved roofs.

The single-class passenger vehicles had one compartment reserved for ladies and two compartments reserved for smoking. They were also fitted with single-gender lavatories at each end, and vestibules (with lock-able doors) for walking through to other cars in a given train. There was a water fountain located about halfway down the corridor in each car.

The first fifteen were built with the standard clerestory roof and entered service between 1913 and 1914. Vans 16-20 were constructed in 1935 and shared the dimensions of the predecessors (rather than taking the wider body of the new-built passenger cars of the time), but had curved roofs fitted.

Details

AW cars
Built from 1911, 29 AW cars were built. They were numbered 1AW to 29AW, and had the then-standard clerestory roofs. Over the years these were found to be insufficient for the traffic, and so numbers 30AW–35AW were built in 1922, the last to have the clerestory roof style. They seated six people in each of the 6 compartments (one reserved for ladies and two reserved for Smoking), plus two more people at each end for a total of 40 passengers. As patronage grew and older cars were retired, construction resumed in 1925. This batch consisted of 36AW to 40AW, but these cars were fitted with the new style of curved roofs.

Of the first 23 cars, when looking from the Ladies end towards the Smoking end, the corridor was on the right-hand side for cars with even numbers, but on the left-hand side for cars with odd numbers. It is not known whether this pattern extended across the rest of the shorter carriage fleet.

On 18 September 1975, 30AW was selected for a trial of in-carriage heating, using two gas cylinders supplied by Gilbarco and fitted to the undercarriage to heat water running through radiators under each seat, in lieu of foot-warmers. This was done because a new timetable, then recently introduced, did not permit enough time to equip each carriage with foot-warmers at regular intervals.

Standard gauge service
In 1972 nine of the 64ft W cars were converted to standard gauge, and they were joined by car 1VBW ex 36AW. The entire consist was painted in blue and gold, and used primarily on special excursion trips such as scouting or defence 'specials' that required one train. The consist provided for up to 652 seats across the ten carriages.

ABW cars
52 58 ft-body ABW cars were built between 1911 and 1925. The earlier Clerestory-roof stock was initially numbered 1ABW to 42ABW and released to service between 1911 and 1914. In 1918–19, cars 43-47ABW were added to the fleet. Then, in early 1925 cars 48ABW to 52ABW were constructed, with the new design of a curved roof, but still retaining all other dimensions of the earlier group.

The carriages were able to seat 44 passengers across six compartments; 19 in First Class and 25 in Second. This breakup was achieved by the two seats at either end, two full and one partial-compartment provided for each class. The two outer-end compartments were classed as Smoking, while the centre two part-compartments (seven seats each) were for Ladies. The fourth seat against the centre-side wall was removed to make way for a door to the ladies' lavatory, while the gentlemen's lavatories were held at either end of the carriage, opposite to the two spare seats and adjacent to the interconnecting diaphragm. The Smoking sections of each car were segregated from the middle by way of a hinged door, and each class section had its own drinking fountain inset into the corridor wall.

Odd-numbered cars from 1 to 42 had the corridor on the left when looking from the first-class end, while the even-numbered cars in this range were built reversed. It is unknown what style was adopted for cars 43–52; however photographs indicate that 44ABW matched the even-number style while 50, 51 and 52ABW matched the odd-number style. Taking into account batch build dates, it is likely that 43 to 47ABW matched the odd/even alterations, while 48–52, the curved-roof batch, were built to the even-number style. Externally, this could be determined by the length of timber panels between windows; the first-class seats were  deeper, thus the first class compartments were  each versus  for the second class compartments; and this is reflected in the window spacing, on both the compartment and corridor side.

From 1961 to 1970, the original, clerestory ABW cars were recoded to ABU to separate them from the larger capacity 64-foot cars. 1ABW was scrapped in 1951 and thus was not converted. Many of the cars that still remained in the 1970s were converted to BU classification, thus becoming second class only. 32ABU and 40ABU often ran with the Vintage Train consist as they retained screw couplings on one end each; and they were occasionally sighted in service as part of a normal train, always coupled together with other stock on either side.

The cars ran until the late 1980s when replaced by the then-new N sets, and many were sold privately. While 37BU was purchased by the Bright museum, 20BU was substituted with both vehicles renumbered after the former was found to have been damaged in a minor collision with a crane.

BW cars
Built from 1911 to 1918 were cars 1BW to 39BW. They were designed to match the AW cars, but were second class and seated 56 people across 7 compartments, plus two at each end. They were almost exactly the same as the AW cars in every other way.

In 1925, cars 40BW to 44BW were built, with the new style of curved roofing. They were otherwise identical to the previous batch.

1BW and 35BW (along with 62BW) appeared in the season one episode "The Copy" of Round the Twist, and were used for filming of scenes between Healesville and Yarra Glen.

10BW and 27BW were destroyed in a collision at Seymour in 1935,  24BW and 29BW was destroyed by fire at Ballarat Car Sheds, 1977 and BW 30 was scrapped in 1970.

CW cars

To supplement the W-series passenger cars, fifteen vans were built in 1913–1914 with clerestory roof outlines and numbered CW 1–15. The vans were nearly identical to the earlier CV vans numbered 3 to 7, with a slightly wider body to take advantage of the E type design advances but the same capacity and length.

An additional five vans were built in 1935, numbered 16–20. These vans were built with the arched roof style introduced from 1925.

Over time these vans had their wooden sides replaced with steel.

Dynamometer Car

A crash at Callington SA in 1929 claimed three E type carriages, 5AE, 9BE and 2D. The surviving parts from those cars were recycled in the construction of the shared V&SAR Dynamometer car, for the purpose of evaluating locomotive performance. Details of the vehicle are covered here instead of on the E type page because the new car reflected more modern construction techniques and styles. This task had previously been achieved with the Dynagraph car, but that did not have the capacity or strength to handle the power output from more modern locomotives. The new car entered service in 1932 for use on both the Victorian and South Australian Railways, and was initially used to test rolling resistance differences between four-wheeled wagons against bogie wagons. Following that, the car was used to test the strength of the S Class locomotives, particularly with loaded freight trains between Wallan and Seymour, and the efficiency of Pulverised Brown Coal (PBC) with engines X32 and later R707. It was also used in tests comparing the performance of Tait and Harris electric trains. Over the life of the vehicle, nearly 1,000 tests were performed.

The end of the carriage which was intended for testing purposes was called the Leading end. From there, the car had a specially designed coupler connected to various instruments within the carriage for testing purposes. From that testing end, there was a  vestibule with a wash basin, followed by an  measurements room with instruments mounted on a central table, then a six-seater compartment with dining table, a  wash room, and a  kitchen. From there the corridor shifted to the centre of the carriage, with a  bathroom on one side and a  lavatory on the other. The trailing end of the carriage was fitted with a diaphragm allowing staff to walk through to adjacent carriages.

The last use of the vehicle was to test radio reception for the "train to base" system, necessary in the operation of a new "alternative safe working" method of train operation where train drivers were given operational authority by radio.

In service

First delivery phase, 1911–1914
1AW-29AW, 1ABW-42ABW, 1BW-35BW

Second delivery phase, 1918–1919
30AW-35AW, 43ABW-47ABW, 36BW-39BW

Third delivery phase, 1925
36AW-40AW, 48ABW-52ABW, 40BW-44BW

Fourth delivery phase, 1935
16CW-20CW

Standard Gauge service – VBW
VBW 1 is at Dorrigo Steam Railway

New Deal, the abolition of wooden rollingstock and preservation
The W type carriages were slowly phased out of service from 1981 as part of the 'New Deal' reforms of passenger rail operations, with twenty going into preservation.

At Healesville's Yarra Valley Railway, cars 1BW, 32BW, 35BW are currently either stored or being restored. 43BW's underframe is stored on site; the timber body had rotted beyond repair and required demolition in recent years.

The Mornington Railway looks after 24AW, 27BU and 17CW, all currently in service.

As of 2013, Steamrail's business plan recorded 32ABU, 40ABU and 14CW as serviceable along with 25AW and 15CW stored. The two ABU cars, formerly utilised as transition-carriages for coupling to the V type carriages because of the screw-couplings fitted, were transferred to the South Gippsland Railway. 14CW is occasionally used in heritage trains not as a guards van, but with fencing installed over the sliding doors as a sort of enthusiasts' observation carriage.

Korumburra's South Gippsland Railway had possession of the operational 17CW, and had leased 32ABU and 40ABU from Steamrail. When the railway folded in 2016, van 17CW was reallocated the Mornington Railway. On 8 December 2018, 32ABU and 40ABU were returned to Newport Workshops by truck.

The Victorian Goldfields Railway controls 23AW, 39AW, 41BU, 42BU and 25ABU, all kept at Maldon station. 23AW, 41BU and 42BU are operational, while 39AW is stored pending restoration and 25ABU is used as a volunteer accommodation carriage. 

31BW was also sold, and it now functions as a restaurant in Tyabb's antique village, near Tyabb Station on the Stony Point Line. 16BW and 38BW have been sold for housing and are now situated north of Ballan. 1CW is stationary at Coal Creek. On Peter J. Vincent's site it is noted that 9CW was sold to what is now 707 Operations, but it does not appear on their website and was last seen in the late 1990s near Trentham. 13CW now resides at Turtons creek in South Gippsland Victoria alongside Tait carriage 220.

Around 2008–2012 a number of stored carriages had to be moved around Newport to make way for new suburban stabling. When this was attempted it was found that a number of carriages had been left in the open for too long, and were beyond repair. As a result, 4CW, which had been in storage at the "Tarp Shop" yard, was scrapped sometime between 28-Sept-2008 and 01 Oct 2008.

Model railways

HO Scale
Kits are produced by Steam Era Models for the short, clerestory-roofed AW and BW carriages; these can be kitbashed into an ABW. Resin-cast curved roofs are available for purchase separately, from either Blue and Gold models or End of the Line Hobbies in Adelaide. The latter company also offers kit construction services, so it is possible to have a carriage built and posted.

Trainbuilder has released brass models of the short W series, at a price of $575+P/H per carriage with lighting included. 35 variants are available, including some each of the AW, BW, ABW, ABU and BU classes; some with arch, some clerestory roofs, some with plate, others timber sides and for the ABW, ABU, BW, BU variants, some marked "Second" and others marked "Economy". 1VBW in blue and gold is also available.

References

 Peter J. Vincent: AW - First Class Sitting cars
 Peter J. Vincent: ABW - First/Second Class cars
 Peter J. Vincent: ABU - Second Class Sitting cars
 Peter J. Vincent: BU - Second Class Sitting cars
 Peter J. Vincent: BW & BWL - Second Class Sitting cars
 Peter J. Vincent: CW - Passenger Guards Vans
 Steamrail-owned W cars
 Railpage thread

Victorian Railways carriages